Mustafa Uğurlu (born 25 November 1955) is a Turkish stage, film and television actor.

Mustafa Uğurlu's father was a health officer and his mother was a housewife from Çorum. His father was appointed to Bursa when he was 2–3 years old and they moved there from Konya. He completed his primary, secondary and high school education in Bursa. He had four siblings, one of which, Ahmet Uğurlu, is also an actor. Uğurlu made his television debut in 1993 with a role in the series Rıza Beyler. His breakthrough came in 1998, with his role in the movie Ağır Roman, for which he won a Golden Orange Award for Best Supporting Actor. He continued his career in cinema and television, and appeared on stage and directed a number of plays for state theatres.

Awards 
International Antalya Film Festival - Best Supporting Actor (Ağır Roman) - 1998

Theatre

As actor 
 Sokrates'in Son Gecesi : Stefan Tsanev : Istanbul State Theatre - 2008
 A Midsummer Night's Dream : William Shakespeare : Istanbul State Theatre - 2006
 Sersemler Evi : Toby Wilsher - Istanbul State Theatre - 2005
 King Lear : William Shakespeare - Istanbul State Theatre - 2002
 Bu Bir Rüyadır : Nâzım Hikmet - Istanbul State Theatre - 2001
 Haydutlar : Friedrich Schiller - Istanbul State Theatre - 2000
 Gilgamesh : Anonymous-Zeynep Avcı - Ankara State Theatre - 1998
 Ateşle Oynayan : Nihat Asyalı - Ankara State Theatre - 1997
 Kugular Şarkı Söylemez : Ferdi Merter - Ankara State Theatre
 Gürültülü Patırtılı Bir Hikaye : Savaş Dinçel - Ankara State Theatre - 1993
 Vatan Diye Diye : Namık Kemal\Necati Cumalı - Ankara State Theatre - 1990
 Ayla Öğretmen : Orhan Asena - Ankara State Theatre - 1991
 Bunu Yapan İki Kişi : Refik Erduran\Tülay Güngör - Ankara State Theatre - 1989
 Nalınlar : Necati Cumalı - Ankara State Theatre - 1986
 Barbaros Hayrettin : Ankara State Theatre
 Lisistrata : Aristophanes - Istanbul State Theatre - 1984
 Düşüş : Nahid Sırrı Örik\Kemal Bekir - Istanbul State Theatre - 1984

As director 
 Nikah Kağıdı : Ephraim Kishon - Ankara State Theatre - 1996
 Tılsım : Mehmet Tayfun Orhon - Adana State Theatre - 1987
 Mustafa : Orhan Asena - Adana State Theatre - 1985

Filmography 
 (2023) Shahmaran (Davut) (TV series)
 (2022–) Aldatmak (Tarık Yenersoy) (TV series)
 (2021) Seni Çok Bekledim (Cemal) (TV series)
 (2018) Çarpışma (Selim Gür) (TV series)
 (2018) Bir Deli Rüzgâr (Cenap) (TV series)
 (2018) Babamın Günahları (Ferruh) (TV series)
 (2016) İçerde (Yusuf) (TV series)
 (2015) Milat (Asaf Demirci) (TV series)
 (2014) Düşler ve Umutlar (Musa)
 (2013) Galip Derviş (Mithat Akerman) (TV series)
 (2012) Çıplak Gerçek (TV series)
 (2012) Bir Zamanlar Osmanlı (TV series)
 (2011) Adalet Oyunu (film)
 (2007) Kader (TV series)
 (2006) Anadolu Kaplanı (TV series)
 (2005) Masum Değiliz (TV series)
 (2005) Yürek Çığlığı (TV film)
 (2004–2005) Bir Dilim Aşk (TV series)
 (2003) Çamur (film)
 (2002) Kolay Para (film)
 (2002) Zor Hedef (TV series)
 (1999) Asansör (film)
 (1997) Ağır Roman (film)
 (1997) Cafe Casablanca (TV series)
 (1996) Baş Belası (film)
 (1995) Melek Apartmanı (TV series)
 (1993) Rıza Beyler (TV series)

References

External links 

1955 births
Turkish male film actors
Turkish male television actors
Turkish male stage actors
Living people
Best Supporting Actor Golden Orange Award winners
People from Karaman